Markeh Mahalleh (also Romanized as Markeh Maḩalleh; also known as Markī Maḩalleh) is a village in Chehel Chay Rural District, in the Central District of Minudasht County, Golestan Province, Iran. At the 2006 census, its population was 372, in 92 families.

References 

Populated places in Minudasht County